Brza Palanka (Serbian Cyrillic: Брза Паланка ) is a town in eastern Serbia, on the right bank of the Danube. It is situated in the Kladovo municipality, in the Bor District. The population of the town is 860 people (2011 census).

The town has its origin in the Roman town of Aegeta (Egeta).

References

Populated places in Bor District
Timok Valley